"No More (Baby I'ma Do Right)" is the debut single of American girl group 3LW from their self-titled debut album (2000). The single was released on August 22, 2000, in the United States reached number 23 on the Billboard Hot 100. The song was then issued in other countries in early 2001, peaking inside the top 10 in the United Kingdom and the top five in New Zealand. The song features lead vocals by Kiely Williams and Adrienne Bailon. There are two versions of the song, both with different rap verses by Kiely Williams.

Music video
"No More (Baby I'ma Do Right)" is also 3LW's first music video. It was shot in August 2000 by director Chris Robinson and released in September. It received a fair amount of video play on TV channels such as BET, The Box and MTV and enjoyed some success on BET's Top Ten Video Countdown, 106 & Park, and MTV's Total Request Live.

Track listings

US CD single
 "No More (Baby I'ma Do Right)" – 4:22
 "I Can't Take It" ("No More" remix featuring Nas) – 4:26
 "No More (Baby I'ma Do Right)" (8-Jam Streetmix) – 5:08
 "No More (Baby I'ma Do Right)" (instrumental) – 4:24
 "No More (Baby I'ma Do Right)" (original rap version a cappella) – 4:14

Australian CD single
 "No More (Baby I'ma Do Right)" (radio edit) – 3:33
 "No More (Baby I'ma Do Right)" – 4:22
  "I Can't Take It" (main "No More" remix featuring Nas) – 4:09
 "No More (Baby I'ma Do Right)" (video)

European CD single
 "No More (Baby I'ma Do Right)"
  "I Can't Take It" (main "No More" remix featuring Nas)

UK CD single
 "No More (Baby I'ma Do Right)" – 3:32
 "No More (Baby I'ma Do Right)" (8-Jam Step Mix) – 5:28
 "No More (Baby I'ma Do Right)" (8-Jam Streetmix) – 5:05
 "I Can't Take It" ("No More" remix) – 4:26
 "No More (Baby I'ma Do Right)" (video)

UK 12-inch single
A1. "No More (Baby I'ma Do Right)" (8-Jam Step Mix) – 5:28
A2. "No More (Baby I'ma Do Right)" (8-Jam Streetmix) – 5:05
B1. "I Can't Take It" ("No More" remix) – 4:26
B2. "No More (Baby I'ma Do Right)" – 4:22

UK cassette single
 "No More (Baby I'ma Do Right)" – 3:32
 "No More (Baby I'ma Do Right)" (8-Jam Streetmix) – 5:05
 "I Can't Take It" ("No More" remix) – 4:26

Charts

Weekly charts

Year-end charts

Certifications

Release history

References

2000 songs
2000 debut singles
3LW songs
Epic Records singles
Music videos directed by Chris Robinson (director)
Songs written by Cam'ron
Songs written by Nate Butler
Hip hop soul songs